

Census
Karivalasa had a population of 500 in 2011. The average literacy rate is 64.5%. Approximately 350 acres in this village.
The Main crop is rice. Other crops are gingili, lentils, greengrams, jute, etc.

References

Villages in Vizianagaram district